Words Came Back to Me is the full-length debut album of Sonya Kitchell. It was released on April 4, 2006 on Velour Recordings. It was sold not only in music shops but also in coffee shops. "Can't Get You Out Of My Mind" was played on the ninth episode of first season of Private Practice.

Track listing
"Let Me Go"  – 3:35
"Train"  – 4:15
"Can't Get You Out Of My Mind"  – 4:09
"Words"  – 4:02
"Cold Day"  – 3:10
"No Matter What"  – 3:58
"Simple Melody"  – 3:26
"Think of You"  – 4:08
"Too Beautiful"  – 4:56
"Tinted Glass"  – 4:16
"I'd Love You"  – 4:01
"Jerry"  – 7:15

Personnel
Sonya Kitchell: vocals
John Shannon: guitar
Garth Stevens: bass
Conor Meehan: drums
Miro Sprague: piano/organ

Charts

References

2006 debut albums
Sonya Kitchell albums